James Egerton Lowndes Wright (10 May 1912 – 14 January 1987) was an English cricketer. Wright was a right-handed batsman. He was born at London.

Educated at Winchester College, he progressed from the college cadet force to enlist in the London Regiment as a 2nd Lieutenant. In 1935 he gained promotion to Lieutenant in the same regiment. In 1937, Wright made a single first-class appearance for the Free Foresters against Oxford University at the University Parks. In a match which Oxford University won by ten wickets, Wright batted twice, scoring 48 runs in the Free Foresters first-innings before being dismissed by Bill Murray-Wood, while in their second-innings he was dismissed for a duck by David Macindoe.

He died at Ashford Hill, Hampshire on 14 January 1987. His father Egerton Wright also played first-class cricket.

References

External links
James Wright at ESPNcricinfo
James Wright at CricketArchive

1912 births
1987 deaths
Military personnel from London
Cricketers from Greater London
People educated at Winchester College
London Regiment officers
English cricketers
Free Foresters cricketers